The Omar is an Indian Bania caste (Levantine or Levites)  found among mainly in Central Uttar Pradesh (Kanpur region), Magadh, Awadh, Vidarbha region and Purvanchal. They claim to have originated from Ayodhya, and then spread to other parts of Awadh, eventually settling in different parts of Uttar Pradesh, Bihar, Maharashtra and Jharkhand. Some theories and ancient texts suggest that the name 'Omar' has been derived from  Om which is a sacred/mystical syllable in the Dharmic or Indian religions, i.e. Hinduism, Jainism, Buddhism.

The Omar is known as Umar in different parts of Uttar Pradesh, Bihar and Jharkhand. They use "Omar" "Umar" and "Gupta" as surname. A majority lives in Kanpur, Mirzapur-com-vindhyachal; sonbhadra Hamirpur, Mahoba, Banda, Jalaun, Mungra Badshahpur, Shahjahanpur, Pratapgarh in suriyawan; and in Deoghar district of Jharkhand; Jamui, Sahibganj, Siwtan, Saran, and Gopalganj districts of Bihar. The standard of living varies from middle class to upper class.

A large and vibrant Omar Vaish also well established themselves as well reputed community at Sakoli region in Vidharbha of Eastern part of Maharashtra. 

The Omar have three sub-divisions: the Til Omar, Derdh Omar and Dosar. The majority of Derdh Omar Vaish live in the Bundelkhand region of Uttar Pradesh and Madhya Pradesh, such as Rath, Orai, Mahoba, Chhatarpur and Jhansi etc.  Historically, the Omar were mainly shopkeepers, industrialists, jewelers, and government officials, but many have now taken to other occupation. Their customs are similar to the Kasaundhan, another Bania community.

See also 
 Bania
 Roniaur

References 

Indian surnames
Urdu-language surnames
Social groups of Uttar Pradesh
Social groups of Bihar
Bania communities